"Gloomy Sunday" (Hungarian: Szomorú vasárnap), also known as the "Hungarian Suicide Song", is a popular song composed by Hungarian pianist and composer Rezső Seress and published in 1933.

The original lyrics were titled "Vége a világnak" (The world is ending) and were about despair caused by war,  ending in a quiet prayer about people's sins. Poet László Jávor wrote his own lyrics to the song, titled Szomorú vasárnap (Sad Sunday), in which the protagonist wants to commit suicide following his lover's death. The latter lyrics ended up becoming more popular while the former were essentially forgotten. The song was first recorded in Hungarian by pop singer Pál Kalmár in 1935.

"Gloomy Sunday" was first recorded in English by Hal Kemp in 1936, with lyrics by Sam M. Lewis, and was recorded the same year by Paul Robeson, with lyrics by Desmond Carter. It became well known throughout much of the English-speaking world after the release of a version by jazz and swing music singer Billie Holiday in 1941. Lewis's lyrics referred to suicide, and the record label described it as the "Hungarian Suicide Song". There is a recurring urban legend which claims that many people have committed suicide while listening to this song, particularly Hungarians.

Writing and background 
The song was composed by Rezső Seress while living in Paris, in an attempt to become established as a songwriter in late 1932. The original musical composition was a piano melody in C minor, with the lyrics being sung over it. Seress wrote the song at the time of the Great Depression and increasing fascist influence in the writer's native Hungary, although sources differ as to the degree to which his song was motivated by personal melancholy rather than concerns about the future of the world. The basis of Seress's lyrics is a reproach to the injustices of man, with a prayer to God to have mercy on the modern world and the people who perpetrate evil. There are some suggestions that the words of "Vége a világnak" were in fact not written until World War II itself and not copyrighted until 1946.

Seress initially had difficulty finding a publisher, mainly due to the unusually melancholy nature of the song. One potential publisher stated:

The song was published as sheet music in late 1933, with lyrics by poet László Jávor, who was inspired by a recent break-up with his fiancée. According to most sources, Jávor rewrote the lyrics after the song's first publication, although he is sometimes described as the original writer of its words. His lyrics contained no political sentiments, but rather were a lament for the death of a beloved and a pledge to meet with the lover again in the afterlife. This version of the song became the best known, and most later rewritings are based around the idea of lost love.

English lyrics

Some English versions add the following verse:

Urban legends
There have been several urban legends regarding the song over the years, mostly involving it being allegedly connected with various numbers of suicides, and radio networks reacting by purportedly banning the song. However, most of these claims are unsubstantiated.

Press reports in the 1930s associated at least 100 suicides, both in Hungary and the United States, with "Gloomy Sunday", but most of the deaths supposedly linked to it are difficult to verify. The urban legend appears to be, for the most part, simply an embellishment of the high number of Hungarian suicides that occurred in the decade when the song was composed due to other factors such as famine and poverty. No studies have drawn a clear link between the song and suicide.

On 11 January 1968, about 35 years after writing the song, its composer killed himself.

The BBC banned Billie Holiday's version of the song from being broadcast, as being detrimental to wartime morale, but allowed performances of instrumental versions.  However, there is little evidence of any other radio bans; the BBC's ban was lifted by 2002.

Later recordings and notable performances
The song's notoriety contributed towards many other notable artists later recording the song, including:

 
 
 
 
 
 
 
 
 
 
 
 
 
 
 
 
 
 
 
 
 
 
 
 
 
 
 
  (singer Billy Mackenzie committed suicide in 1997)
 
  
 
 
 
  (as a bridge in their song "Blood Orgy of the Atomic Fern")
  (French version)
 
  
 
 
 
 
 
 
 
 
 
 
 
 
  (she also performed it live at the funeral of her friend, the fashion designer Alexander McQueen later in 2010.
 
 
 
 
 
 
  (Legacy album)
 
 
 
 
 
 
 
 
 
 
 
 
 
 
 
 
 
 
 
 
 
 
 
 
 
 
 
 
 
 
 2013: Hekte Zaren (inspired by Diamanda Galas' version)
 
 
 
 
 
 
 
 
 2016: Boston Chamber Orchestra (orchestrated by Ivan Linn, from the film score of The Tenants Downstairs)

Legacy

A cover of the song appeared on the Associates' second studio album Sulk, released on 14 May 1982, and named 'Album of the Year' in Melody Maker at the end of 1982. Lead vocalist Billy Mackenzie killed himself on 22 January 1997.

The song's lyrics are featured in the bridge of the Dead Milkmen song "Blood Orgy of the Atomic Fern", on the band's 1987 album Bucky Fellini.

A highly fictional version of the song's origin is at the heart of the 1999 German/Hungarian film Ein Lied von Liebe und Tod (Gloomy Sunday – A Song of Love and Death).

A cover of "Gloomy Sunday" is featured on track three of Venetian Snares's 2005 album Rossz Csillag Alatt Született. It also samples Billie Holiday's vocals.

The song inspired the 2006 movie The Kovak Box, in which a writer is trapped on the island of Mallorca with people who are injected with a microchip that causes them to take their own lives when they hear "Gloomy Sunday". The song plays during the movie, sung by the actress Lucía Jiménez. A music video from the cover was released as part of the movie promotion. The song also features on the soundtrack of Wristcutters: A Love Story (2006), performed by Artie Shaw.

In 2008, Belgian artist Marieke Van Wuytswinkel used a sample of "Gloomy Sunday" in her work A Natural Morning.

See also
 Copycat suicide
 Gloomy Sunday (movie)
 To ostatnia niedziela

References

External links
 
 
 

1933 songs
Songs about suicide
Songs banned by the BBC
Hungarian songs
Songs with lyrics by Sam M. Lewis
The Associates (band) songs
Billie Holiday songs
Paul Robeson songs
Serge Gainsbourg songs
Sarah Brightman songs
Great Depression songs

hu:Seress Rezső#Szomorú vasárnap